Events in the year 1888 in Brazil.

Incumbents
Monarch – Pedro II
Prime Minister – João Alfredo Correia de Oliveira

Events
May 13 – Lei Áurea (Golden Law) abolishes slavery in Brazil.

Births
September 3 – Nereu Ramos, 20th president of Brazil (died 1958)
December 29 – Gustavo Barroso, lawyer and politician (died 1957)

Deaths
January 17 – Robert Reid Kalley, Scottish missionary who introduced Presbyterian  to Brazil (born 1809)
August 18 – Franklin Távora, lawyer and politician (born 1842)

References

 
1880s in Brazil
Years of the 19th century in Brazil
Brazil
Brazil